WRJL-FM (99.9 FM, "99.9 All Gospel") is a radio station licensed to serve Eva, Alabama, United States.  The station is owned by Rojo, Inc.

It broadcasts a southern gospel music format that serves Huntsville, Alabama, and central North Alabama.

History
This station received its original construction permit from the Federal Communications Commission on May 31, 1996.  The new station was assigned the call letters WRJL-FM by the FCC on August 30, 1996.  WRJL-FM received its license to cover from the FCC on November 2, 1999.

Upgrades
In January 2006, the FCC issued a construction permit to allow WRJL-FM to upgrade from Class A to Class C3 and upgrade their 6,000 watt signal to an effective radiated power of 25,000 watts.  The station received its license to cover these changes on February 13, 2009.

References

External links

RJL
Southern Gospel radio stations in the United States
Radio stations established in 1996
Morgan County, Alabama
RJL
1996 establishments in Alabama